Euthrenopsis is a genus of sea snails, marine gastropod mollusks in the family Buccinidae, the true whelks. All species in the family are endemic to the waters of New Zealand.

Species
Species within the genus Euthrenopsis include:
 Euthrenopsis bountyensis Powell, 1929
 Euthrenopsis otagoensis Powell, 1929
 Euthrenopsis venusta Powell, 1929

References

Buccinidae
Gastropod genera
Gastropods described in 1929
Gastropods of New Zealand
Endemic fauna of New Zealand
Endemic molluscs of New Zealand
Molluscs of the Pacific Ocean
Taxa named by Arthur William Baden Powell